Lysandra is a genus of butterflies in the family Lycaenidae.

Species
Listed alphabetically:

 Lysandra albicans (Gerhard, 1851)
 Lysandra apennina (Zeller, 1847)
 Lysandra arzanovi (Stradomsky & Shchurov, 2005)
 Lysandra bellargus (Rottemburg, 1775)
 Lysandra caelestissima (Verity, 1921)
 Lysandra caucasica (Lederer, 1870)
 Lysandra coridon (Poda, 1761)
 Lysandra corydonius (Herrich-Schäffer, [1852])
 Lysandra dezina de Freina & Witt, 1983
 Lysandra gennargenti Leigheb, 1987
 Lysandra hispana (Herrich-Schäffer, [1851])
 Lysandra melamarina Dantchenko, 2000
 Lysandra nufrellensis Schurian, 1977
 Lysandra ossmar (Gerhard, 1851)
 Lysandra punctifera (Oberthür, 1876)
 Lysandra sheikh Dantchenko, 2000
 Lysandra syriaca (Tutt, 1914)

References

  (2012): Establishing criteria for higher-level classification using molecular data: the systematics of Polyommatus blue butterflies (Lepidoptera, Lycaenidae). Cladistics. 10.1111/j.1096-0031.2012.00421.x
  (2013): In the shadow of phylogenetic uncertainty: The recent diversification of Lysandra butterflies through chromosomal change. Molecular Phylogenetics and Evolution 69: 469–478.

External links

 
Lycaenidae genera